Kerer is a village in the Şahinbey District, Gaziantep Province, Turkey. The village is inhabited by Abdals of the Kara Hacılar tribe and had a population of  127 in 2022.

References

Villages in Şahinbey District